Friends of a Democratic Cuba is a group formed in 2006 that is composed of representatives from six former Soviet-bloc nations – the Czech Republic, Hungary, Lithuania, Poland, Slovakia, and Slovenia. They long to end what they describe as totalitarianism by helping the Cuban people obtain uncensored information and promote what they describe as democratic change in Cuba.

References

Opposition to Fidel Castro